Duggi may refer to:

 Duggi, bass drum, part of the tabla duet
 Duggi (drum), traditional drum that accompanies shehnai and bauls musicians
 Duggi (town), a town in Tenerife, Canary Islands, Spain